GU Law can refer to:
Georgetown University Law Center
Gonzaga University School of Law